Janarthanan Kesavan (born 19 September 1991) (also known as Jana) is a Mouth painter based in Chennai, Tamil Nadu. He won the National Bal Shree Honour.

Early life
K. Janarthanan was born in Chennai on 19 September 1991. He lost his hand in an electric accident when he was eight years old. He learned how to write and paint using his mouth.

Awards and recognition
 2004: "Bal Shree" award received from the Indian President, Dr. A.P.J. Abdul Kalam

References

1991 births
20th-century Indian painters
Artists from Chennai
Living people
Indian male painters
20th-century Indian male artists